"Lies" is a song by the English rock band the Rolling Stones from their 1978 album Some Girls.

The song is a fast-paced rocker is about a man being fed up with his girlfriend's lying and cheating. As with most of Some Girls, it features the five core Stones members, with Jagger, Richards and Ronnie Wood sharing electric guitar duties.

Use in television
The track was featured on WKRP in Cincinnati on the episode "Pilot: Part Two". However, "Lies", although performed during the 1978 US tour, was the only track on Some Girls to be permanently dropped from live setlists after the last dates supporting its parent album.

References

 Cyrus R. K. Patell, Rolling Stones' Some Girls, A&C Black, 9 June 2011, p. 84ff.

The Rolling Stones songs
1978 songs
Songs written by Jagger–Richards
Song recordings produced by Jagger–Richards